Sweden has participated at the Youth Olympic Games in every edition since the inaugural 2010 Games and has earned medals from every edition. Sweden has never hosted the Youth Olympics, but showed interest to bid for the 2018 Summer Games.

Medalists

Summer Youth Olympic Games

Winter Youth Olympic Games

Mixed-NOC's teams
Note: Medals awarded in mixed NOC's are not counted for the respective country in the overall medal table.

Medal tables

Medals by Summer Games

Medals by Winter Games

Medals by summer sport

Medals by winter sport

Competitors

Summer Games

Winter Games

Flag bearers

See also
Sweden at the Olympics
Sweden at the Paralympics

 
Youth sport in Sweden
Nations at the Youth Olympic Games